The Denmark–Sweden football rivalry is a highly competitive sports rivalry that exists between the national men's football teams of Denmark and Sweden. The clashes between the two neighbouring countries has since the very first match in 1913 attracted large crowds that have witnessed several spectacular games and controversial incidents, despite the fact that the two teams very seldom have met in any of the larger international football tournaments. Sweden leads the series 46–20–41.

Memorable competitive matches

Euro 1992 group match

Hosting the 1992 European Championships, Sweden was playing in only its second-ever game in the tournament's history when they faced Denmark at Råsunda Stadium in Solna. A goal from Tomas Brolin was enough to give Sweden its first-ever Euro victory with a 1–0 win over Denmark. Sweden finished ahead of eventual winners Denmark in the group.

Euro 2004 group match

In the group stage of the UEFA Euro 2004 tournament, the two teams met each other for the first competitive game since the UEFA Euro 1992 group stage, and the first rivalry game since April 2000.

Prior to the game on 22 June 2004, the group C standings were as shown in the adjacent table. Simultaneously with the game, Italy faced Bulgaria. With a win, Italy would advance from the group stage, unless Denmark and Sweden drew their game, causing all three teams to end with five points. The tiebreaker would then be the match results between the tied teams, and with Sweden playing 1–1 and Denmark 0–0 with Italy, a Denmark-Sweden draw of 2–2 or higher would leave Italy with one goal from the tied matches, and send both Sweden and Denmark through to the quarter finals, regardless of the Italian side's efforts.

After a 28th-minute opener by Jon Dahl Tomasson, Henrik Larsson equalised on a penalty shortly after the break. Tomasson brought Denmark one up again in the 66th minute, but just minutes before the final whistle, Mattias Jonson equalised for Sweden to make up the final score of 2–2.

The Italians, meanwhile, had beaten Bulgaria by 2–1 on a goal in the fourth minute of stoppage time, which would have otherwise sent them through. This caused an uproar within the Italian team, with goalkeeper Gianluigi Buffon and Italian football federation president Franco Carraro both accusing the Danish and Swedish team of match fixing. However then-Italian manager Giovanni Trapattoni said that neither he nor the federation would protest against the result. UEFA did not investigate the case.

Abandoned 2008 Euro qualifier 

The next rivalry games came in the UEFA Euro 2008 qualification group games. The first game was played on 2 June 2007, and started out with the Swedish side going three goals up after two goals from Johan Elmander and one from Petter Hansson in the first half-hour of the game. However, through goals by Daniel Agger, Jon Dahl Tomasson and Leon Andreasen, Denmark completed a remarkable comeback.

In the 89th minute, Denmark's Christian Poulsen hit Markus Rosenberg in the stomach, prompting German referee Herbert Fandel to send him off and award Sweden a penalty kick. Before the penalty kick could be executed, a Danish supporter ran unto the pitch and attempted to punch Fandel, but was stopped by Denmark's Michael Gravgaard. Fandel abandoned the match, Sweden was awarded the match as a 3–0 win, and Denmark was sentenced to play its next two qualifying matches at least 140 km away from Copenhagen. The two teams met for the re-match on 8 September 2007 in Stockholm, which ended in a 0–0 draw. Sweden eventually qualified for the UEFA Euro 2008, while Denmark finished fourth in the group and was eliminated.

2010 FIFA World Cup qualifiers 

The two teams were once more drawn in the same group for the 2010 FIFA World Cup qualification. On 6 June 2009, Denmark defeated Sweden 1–0 in Solna, the first victory for Denmark over Sweden since 1996. Sweden's Kim Källström was given a penalty early in the game, but Thomas Sørensen saved the shot. Denmark's Thomas Kahlenberg scored the only goal in the 22nd minute after a defensive mistake by Mikael Nilsson.

The 10 October 2009 re-match was the first rivalry game at Parken Stadium since the controversial fan attack incident. During the game, Sweden had two goals correctly annulled for offside, before Denmark's Jakob Poulsen scored the only goal in the 78th minute. Denmark won the game 1–0, and secured Danish qualification for the 2010 FIFA World Cup, while Sweden eventually finished third and were eliminated.

2016 UEFA Euro qualifying play-offs 

Once again both rivals faced for a spot in 2016 UEFA Euro, with Sweden the first leg at home by 2–1 with a 45th-minute goal from Emil Forsberg and a penalty converted by Zlatan Ibrahimović on 50th minute, Nicolai Jørgensen scored for Denmark on the 89th minute. 

The return fixture in Denmark saw a 2–2 draw, Ibrahimović scored a brace, scoring in 19th and 76th minute respectively. Yussuf Poulsen opened scoring for Denmark with a goal at the 82nd minute and Jannik Vestergaard scored one at the last minute of the game. Sweden won 4–3 on aggregate.

Sweden won 4–3 on aggregate and qualified for UEFA Euro 2016.

Comparison of Denmark and Sweden in major international tournaments

Statistics

See also
Battle of Jutland
Copenhagen Derby
Football derbies in Sweden

References 

Print

Online

A-LANDSKAMPE – SVERIGE at Haslund.info

Notes 

 
International association football rivalries
Sweden
Sweden national football team
Denmark–Sweden relations
Denmark at UEFA Euro 1992
Denmark at UEFA Euro 2004
Sweden at UEFA Euro 1992
Sweden at UEFA Euro 2004